Sculpture is one of the oldest arts in Mexico. In Prehispanic Mexico, it is present in pyramids, sanctuaries, esplanades and communal objects; examples of this are the Olmec, Mayan, Teotihuacan, Tarascan, Mixtec and Aztec sculptures.

Many of these sculptures have been cataloged as masterpieces and stand out for their monumentality, since many of them are huge and exposed to be seen publicly.

By century

16th and 17th centuries 

Sculpture after the conquest is divided into two areas: decorative and statuary. Both were made in stone or wood. Plateresque art was essentially sculptural and in the Colony it produced important altarpieces.

In the cathedral of Mexico, work Claudio Arciniega and Juan Miguel Agüero. It will become the paradigm of colonial architecture. Francisco Becerra will raise the cathedral of Puebla. Francisco Antonio Guerrero y Torres: Chapel of the Pocito, in the Villa de Guadalupe. In Puebla, a very active baroque school appears. Sanctuaries of Ocotlán in Tlaxcala, and of San Francisco de Acatepec, two magnificent examples of the Novohispano Baroque.

In all the colonial cities, fine finishes in the ornamentation and the facades of the churches can be appreciated. Oaxaca and its numerous temples like Soledad and Santo Domingo show the beauty and magnificence of it.

18th century 

The academies created in Europe from the s17th century were founded on the rational abandoning the purely religious vision that had dominated the previous centuries. In New Spain, this philosophy sparked a reaction against the baroque. Thus, altarpieces that were essentially sculptural were considered overloaded and replaced by architectural manifestations. The central figure of this era in New Spain is the Spaniard Manuel Tolsá.

19th century 

Romanticism tended to break the norms and strict models of classicism, as it pursued ideas influenced by realism and nationalism. Religious sculpture was reduced to sporadic imagery, while secular sculpture continued in portraits and monumental art of a civic nature.

Between 1820 and 1880 the predominant themes were, successively: religious images, biblical scenes, allegories to the symbols of the insurgency movement and scenes and characters of pre-Cortesian history, and portraits of the old aristocracy, of the rising bourgeoisie and champions of the pre revolution. The transcendent sphere consisted in introducing civil reasons, the first national types and glimpses of a current of self-expression.

20th century 

Differentiated by its objectives and the emphasis of its theme, three currents emerged: an indigenist, archaic and folkloric; another, neoclassical, civic and historical; and a third, socialist, with ideological propaganda.

During the 20th century, great exponents of Mexican sculpture are Rómulo Rozo, Enrique Gottdiener Soto, Juan Soriano, José Luis Cuevas, Sebastián and Mathias Goeritz.

21st century 
During the 21st century, great exponents of Mexican sculpture are Pedro Reyes.

Gallery

See also
List of statues on Paseo de la Reforma

References 

 Rodríguez Prampolini, Ida (1997). La Crítica De Arte En México En El Siglo XIX. México: Instituto de Investigaciones Estéticas, UNAM. .